These hits topped the Dutch Top 40 in 1977.

See also
1977 in music

References

1977 in the Netherlands
1977 record charts
1977